John Hartley (1839–1915) was an English poet who worked in the Yorkshire dialect. He wrote a great deal of prose and poetry – often of a sentimental nature – dealing with the poverty of the district. He was born in Halifax, West Yorkshire.

Hartley wrote and edited the Original Illuminated Clock Almanack from 1866 to his death.

Most of Hartley's works are written in dialect.

Hartley wrote a number of books featuring the character "Sammywell Grimes", who has a number of adventures and suffers unfortunate mishaps.

Works
Yorkshire Ditties, First Series
Yorkshire Ditties, Second Series
Yorkshire Tales, First Series
Yorkshire Tales, Second Series
Yorkshire Tales, Third Series
Yorkshire Lyrics (1898)
Pensive Poems and Startling Stories
A Rolling Stone. A Tale of Wrongs and Revenge
Mally An' Me : A selection of Humorous and Pathetic Incidents from the Life of Sammywell Grimes and His Wife Mally (1902)
Yorksher Puddin (1876)
A Sheaf from the Moorland - A Collection of Original Poems
Grimes' Visit To Th' Queen. A Royal Time Amang Royalties
Seets I'Lundun: A Yorkshireman's Ten Days' Trip
Seets i' Yorkshire and Lancashire or Grimes' Comical Trip from Leeds to Liverpool by Canal
Seets i' Blackpool - Grimes at the Seaside
Seets i' Paris - Sammywell Grimes’s trip with his old chum Billy Baccus; his opinion o’th' French, and th' French opinion o’th' exhibition he made ov hissen.
Grimes' Trip to America - Ten letters from Sammywell to John Jones Smith
Sammywell Grimes An' his Wife Mally Laikin I' Lakeland: A Humorous Account of their Visit to the Home of Famous Poets, &c., &c.

External links
 
 
 
Yorkshire Ditties by John Hartley - Link fails 25 October 2008 - permissions
John Hartley at Old Poetry

1839 births
1915 deaths
English humorists
People from Halifax, West Yorkshire
English male poets
Writers about Yorkshire